Central Camp is an unincorporated community in Madera County, California.

References

Unincorporated communities in California
Unincorporated communities in Madera County, California